Kondapalli Appala Naidu / Kondapalli Appalanaidu is also known as 'K.A. Naidu'. is an Andhra Pradesh politician. Telugu Desam Party leader.

Personal life
Naidu was born at Gantyada village and mandal in Vizianagaram district in 1967 to agricultural family Kondapalli Pydithalli Naidu and Appayyamma. His father was represented thrice as Member of Parliament.

Political life
Dr.kondapalli appalanaidu also called as Dr.K.A.Naidu was Contested as MP From  Bobbili (Parliament constituency) parliament in bye election of 2006, contested as Vizianagaram (Parliament constituency) MP for 2009, both times he lost with less margin. From 2009 he was incharge for  Vizianagaram (Parliament constituency) and also Cheepurupalli (Assembly constituency). Later he won as  MLA from Gajapathinagaram (Assembly constituency) in Vijayanagaram district  in 2014. 

 In 2019, he lost to Botsa Appala Narasayya of the YSRCP party.  He is currently holding Gajapathinagaram (Assembly constituency) telugudesam party incharge and also Parliament coordinator (observer) for Guntur (Parliament constituency) andMachilipatnam (Parliament constituency) on behalf of the Telugu Desam Party. From 1982 his family supporting Telugu Desam Party only. It was his strength.

References

Living people
Andhra Pradesh politicians
People from Vizianagaram
People from Vizianagaram district
People from Uttarandhra
Telugu Desam Party politicians
Year of birth missing (living people)
Andhra Pradesh MLAs 2014–2019